The verditer flycatcher (Eumyias thalassinus) is an Old World flycatcher It is found from the Himalayas through Southeast Asia to Sumatra. This species is named after its distinctive shade of copper-sulphate blue and has a dark patch between the eyes and above the bill base. The adult males are intense blue on all areas of the body, except for the black eye-patch and grey vent. Adult females and sub-adults are lighter blue.

The verditer flycatcher is also interesting among the flycatchers in that they forage above the canopy level and perching on electric wires or exposed tree top branches.

This species was earlier placed in the genus Muscicapa and it has been suggested that it is closer to the Niltava flycatchers.

Gallery

References

verditer flycatcher
Birds of South China
Birds of Northeast India
Birds of the Himalayas
Birds of Yunnan
Birds of Southeast Asia
verditer flycatcher